Adrian Darnell White (born April 6, 1964) is an American former college and professional football player who was a safety in the National Football League (NFL) for seven seasons during the 1980s and 1990s.  White played college football for the University of Florida, and thereafter, he played professionally for the New York Giants, Green Bay Packers and New England Patriots of the NFL.  He became an assistant coach after his playing career ended.

Early years 

White was born in Jacksonville, Florida in 1964.  He attended Orange Park High School where he played high school football for the Orange Park Raiders.

College career 

White began his college career at Southern Illinois University in Carbondale, Illinois, and he played football for the Southern Illinois Salukis for a single season in 1983.  He transferred to the University of Florida in Gainesville, Florida where he was a walk-on for coach Charlie Pell's Florida Gators football team from 1984 to 1986.  White was a three-year starter for the Gators, and a key member of the Gators' defense during the 1984 and 1985 seasons, when the Gators posted identical 9–1–1 overall win–loss records and led the Southeastern Conference (SEC) with best-in-the-SEC records of 5–0–1 and 5–1.  He was a first-team All-SEC selection and a second-team All-American as a senior in 1986.  White was also a two-year Florida Gators track and field letterman as a sprinter and anchored the Gators' 4x100-meter relay team that included Olympian Dennis Mitchell.

White graduated from the University of Florida with a bachelor's degree in criminal justice in 1993, and later earned a master's degree in education from Fairleigh Dickinson University in Teaneck, New Jersey.

Professional career 

White finished his NFL playing career with single-season stints with the Green Bay Packers and the New England Patriots. During his seven-season NFL career, White played in 70 regular season games, started five of them, and had four interceptions.

Coaching career 

White was the assistant coach for defensive quality control promoted to assistant defensive backs coach for the Buffalo Bills, and his responsibilities included opposition scouting and self-scouting, as well as working with the Bills' defensive backs corps.  He was one of three assistants retained from the previous coaching staff by the Bills' new head coach, Chan Gailey, having previously been a Bills assistant for two years. He was with the Bills from 2008 to 2012, when he, along with the entire Bills coaching staff, was dismissed on December 31, 2012.

See also 

 Florida Gators football, 1980–89
 List of Florida Gators football All-Americans
 List of Florida Gators in the NFL Draft
 List of Green Bay Packers players
 List of New England Patriots players
 List of New York Giants players
 List of University of Florida alumni

References

Bibliography 

 Carlson, Norm, University of Florida Football Vault: The History of the Florida Gators, Whitman Publishing, LLC, Atlanta, Georgia (2007).  .
 Golenbock, Peter, Go Gators!  An Oral History of Florida's Pursuit of Gridiron Glory, Legends Publishing, LLC, St. Petersburg, Florida (2002).  .
 Hairston, Jack, Tales from the Gator Swamp: A Collection of the Greatest Gator Stories Ever Told, Sports Publishing, LLC, Champaign, Illinois (2002).  .
 McCarthy, Kevin M.,  Fightin' Gators: A History of University of Florida Football, Arcadia Publishing, Mount Pleasant, South Carolina (2000).  .
 Nash, Noel, ed., The Gainesville Sun Presents The Greatest Moments in Florida Gators Football, Sports Publishing, Inc., Champaign, Illinois (1998).  .

External links 
  Adrian White – Buffalo Bills coach profile

1964 births
Living people
People from Orange Park, Florida
Players of American football from Florida
Southern Illinois Salukis football players
Florida Gators football players
New York Giants players
Green Bay Packers players
New England Patriots players
American male sprinters
Track and field athletes from Florida
Track and field athletes in the National Football League
Florida Gators men's track and field athletes
Coaches of American football from Florida
Southern Illinois Salukis football coaches
Rhein Fire coaches
Indiana State Sycamores football coaches
Berlin Thunder coaches
Buffalo Bills coaches
Jacksonville Sharks coaches
Orange Park High School alumni
American expatriate sportspeople in Germany
Fairleigh Dickinson University alumni
Ed Block Courage Award recipients